"Let the Beat Go On" is a song recorded by the Sweden-based musician and producer Dr. Alban. It was released in August 1994 as the third single from his third studio album, Look Who's Talking (1994). The song is written and produced by Alban with Kristian Lundin and John Amatiello, and the chorus is sung by Swedish singers Nana Hedin and Jessica Folcker. This Eurodance song charted in many European countries, peaking at number-one in Spain, number three in Finland and number nine in Belgium.

Critical reception
Larry Flick from Billboard wrote that Dr. Alban "should easily match the success of the previous "Away From Home" with this jaunty ditty, which combines elements of pop/rave, hi-NRG, and electro-trance. His tense vocal snaps over a twinkling array of keyboards that will remind some of vintage Giorgio Moroder. Behind the frenzied vocal/synth action is a giddy pop chorus that never leaves the brain after the first spin. Those who like to hang onto the cutting edge will probably prefer the riotous Jungle Speed mix. A gem from the set "Look Who's Talking"." Pan-European magazine Music & Media noted, "Probably the doctor's most one-dimensional Euro effort ever, he'll get automatic daytime airplay anyway because of the simple, unavoidable melody."

Chart performance
"Let the Beat Go On" went on to become a major hit in many European countries, although it didn't reach the same level of success as "It's My Life", "Sing Hallelujah" and "Look Who's Talking". It peaked at number-one in Spain, and also managed to climb into the Top 10 in Finland and Belgium. Additionally, the single was a Top 20 hit in France, Germany, the Netherlands and Sweden, as well as on the Eurochart Hot 100. Outside Europe, "Let the Beat Go On" reached number eight on the RPM Dance/Urban chart in Canada, number 12 in Israel and number 186 in Australia.

Music video
The music video for "Let the Beat Go On" was directed by Jonathan Bate. Bate also directed the music videos for "Look Who's Talking" and "Away from Home". The video was uploaded to YouTube in December 2011. As of August 2020, it has got more than 2,2 million views.

Track listings

 7" single, Europe (1994)
 "Let The Beat Go On" (Short) — 4:03
 "Let The Beat Go On" (DinDogAmaDub) — 5:26

 12" single, Europe (1994)
" Let The Beat Go On" (Long) — 5:28
" Let The Beat Go On" (Dindogamadub) — 5:26

 CD single, France (1994)
 "Let the Beat Go On" (Short) — 4:03
 "Let the Beat Go On" (Long) — 5:28

 CD maxi, Europe (1994)
 "Let the Beat Go On" (Short) — 4:03
 "Let the Beat Go On" (Long) — 5:28
 "Let the Beat Go On" (Jungle Speed) — 5:27
 "Let the Beat Go On" (Dingogamadub) — 5:26

 CD maxi, US (1995)
 "Let The Beat Go On (Short) — 4:03
 "Let The Beat Go On (House Of Peo Single Mix) — 4:12
 "Let The Beat Go On (Long) — 5:28
 "Let The Beat Go On (House Of Peo Extended Club Mix) — 5:42
 "Let The Beat Go On (Jungle Speed) — 5:27
 "Let The Beat Go On (Dindogamadub) — 5:26

Charts

Weekly charts

Year-end charts

References

1994 singles
Dr. Alban songs
Nana Hedin songs
Number-one singles in Spain
Songs written by Dr. Alban
Songs written by Kristian Lundin
1994 songs
English-language Swedish songs
Music videos directed by Jonathan Bate